Osmo Lennart Orkomies (8 October 1912 in Juankoski – 12 May 1996) was a Finnish diplomat, educated lawyer. He was an Envoy in Germany from 1950 to 1952. He was appointed head of the division for political affairs at the Ministry for Foreign Affairs in January 1959. He was then Ambassador to Bern in 1959–1962 and Cairo from 1962 to 1966. He was an ambassador in Warsaw 1967–1972, Algiers and Tunis 1975–1979.

References

External links

Ambassadors of Finland to Switzerland
Ambassadors of Finland to Egypt
Ambassadors of Finland to Poland
Ambassadors of Finland to Algeria
Ambassadors of Finland to Tunisia
20th-century Finnish lawyers
1912 births
1996 deaths